Lists of invasive species in Australasia, the invasive species within the Australasia geographic region and Australasian realm of southern Oceania.

Geography
It includes the introduced invasive plant and animal species naturalized within the nations of Australia and New Zealand; the international island of New Guinea, within the nation of Papua New Guinea and in Western New Guinea province of Indonesia; and neighbouring islands in the Pacific Ocean.

Lists and categories
List of invasive species in Australia
:Category: Invasive species in Australia
Invasive species in New Zealand
:Category: Invasive species in New Zealand

See also

:Category: Lists of invasive species

Australasian realm

Australasia
i
i

cs:Seznam invazních živočichů
fr:Liste d'espèces invasives
nl:Lijst van invasieve soorten
ru:Список инвазивных видов